Winfield School District may refer to:
 Winfield Unified School District 465 (Kansas)
 Winfield R-IV School District (Missouri)
 Winfield Independent School District (Texas)